Paunikha is a rural locality (a village) in Razinskoye Rural Settlement, Kharovsky District, Vologda Oblast, Russia. The population was 18 as of 2002.

Geography 
Paunikha is located 30 km north of Kharovsk (the district's administrative centre) by road. Fedyakovo is the nearest rural locality.

References 

Rural localities in Kharovsky District